Kerstin Kielgass (German spelling: Kerstin Kielgaß; born 6 December 1969) is a German former swimmer.

Kielgass won her first major title in 1985 in the East German 4×100 m relay team at the World Championships. She also won as a member of the 4×200 m relay teams in the 1991 and 1998 World Aquatics Championships. In 1995, she won at the European Championships in the 200 m freestyle and in 1997 in the 800 m freestyle.

In the 200 m freestyle at the 1992 Summer Olympics, Kielgass won the bronze medal. In the 4×100 m freestyle relay at the 1992 Summer Olympics, she was a member of the team in the heats but did not take part in the final, in which Germany won the bronze medal. In the 4×200 m freestyle relay at the 1996 Summer Olympics, she was a member of the German team who won the silver medal, and in the 4×200 m freestyle relay in the 2000 Summer Olympics, she was a member of the German team who won the bronze medal. Following the 2000 Summer Olympics, she announced her retirement from competitive swimming.

References

Swimmers from Berlin
Olympic swimmers of Germany
Olympic silver medalists for Germany
Olympic bronze medalists for Germany
1969 births
Living people
Olympic bronze medalists in swimming
German female freestyle swimmers
World Aquatics Championships medalists in swimming
Swimmers at the 1992 Summer Olympics
Swimmers at the 1996 Summer Olympics
Swimmers at the 2000 Summer Olympics
Medalists at the FINA World Swimming Championships (25 m)
European Aquatics Championships medalists in swimming
Medalists at the 2000 Summer Olympics
Medalists at the 1996 Summer Olympics
Medalists at the 1992 Summer Olympics
Olympic silver medalists in swimming
Recipients of the Patriotic Order of Merit